Central administration is the leading or presiding  body or group of people, and the highest administrative department which oversees all lower departments of an organization.

Education
In most cases, a school or school district will have a leading group of people as a part of central administration. In a school district, these terms may include a Superintendent (education), chief operating officer, school headmaster, and/or other leadership roles in one or more specific department. People on central administration are usually appointed by a board, such as a Board of education. They are comparable to positions such as a Chief executive officer. They rank over all other administration, requiring leadership skills. Central administrative staff have an executive oversight and supervision on school and/or school district administration. The department exists in Universities as well again playing a key role in the organisation of the department. The department is often also tasked with data protection, disaster control planning and other areas.

Government

Central administration is also a key part of the civil service in many countries; in the United Kingdom, for example, the department supports the chief executive's office and other key areas. 
In the United States, many arms of government have a central administration department. For instance, in correctional facilities, the office of the director is under its tutelage.
It plays a role in the function of various arms of state, such as in India, where it plays a pivotal role in the functioning of the civil service. The department also plays a key role in making critical decisions for many countries; in Pakistan (which borders India), for example, there has been a discussion about whether the government should bring rebellious minded tribal areas under tighter control of central administration.

Organizations
In many other organizations, a “central administration” department plays a key role to its function. In the information technology sector, Central Administration is a key resource, along with development teams. 
Central administration departments are often tasked with providing IT Support to various organisations, providing key technological support. The nature of the role means the professionals have very high access to PC systems (domain admins, etc.) as they need to undertake functions that include creation and amending of user accounts.

Software
Central administration can refer both to people within a department as well as consoles, applications, and other tools that help its function. Central administration is part of Windows SharePoint server; it allows system administrators or those within Central admin departments the ability to prioritise various tasks as well as allowing users to view resources and currently running services.

See also
 English law
 Chief administrative officer
 Chief executive officer
 Superintendent (education)
 Chief operating officer
 Executive director
 Senior management
 Board of directors
 Trustee
 Board of education
 Board of governors

References

Management by type